The Central de Inteligencia Militar (Military Intelligence Center, CIM) is an Argentine intelligence agency in charge of permanently assisting and coordinating the functions and operations of all Army intelligence services.

See also
Army Intelligence Service
Naval Intelligence Service
Air Force Intelligence Service
National Intelligence System
National Directorate of Strategic Military Intelligence

Argentine intelligence agencies
Military intelligence agencies